José Wilson (born 15 December 1931) is a Brazilian modern pentathlete. He competed at the 1960 and 1964 Summer Olympics.

References

External links
 

1931 births
Living people
Brazilian male modern pentathletes
Olympic modern pentathletes of Brazil
Modern pentathletes at the 1960 Summer Olympics
Modern pentathletes at the 1964 Summer Olympics
Sportspeople from Ceará
Pan American Games silver medalists for Brazil
Pan American Games medalists in modern pentathlon
Competitors at the 1959 Pan American Games
Modern pentathletes at the 1963 Pan American Games
Medalists at the 1959 Pan American Games
Medalists at the 1963 Pan American Games
20th-century Brazilian people
21st-century Brazilian people